Qanus Island is a river island located in the Tigris River in Salah Ad Din Province, northern Iraq. 

After it became a staging area for the Islamic State of Iraq and Syria terrorist organization during an insurgency in the 2010s, it was bombed on 10 September 2019. American F-15 and F-35 fighter jets dropped 40 tonnes of explosives (more than 80.000 pounds of laser-guided bombs) by the US-led coalition forces. According to Major General Eric T Hill, "We're denying Daesh the ability to hide on Qanus Island".

References

Islamic State of Iraq and the Levant in Iraq
Islands of Iraq
Tigris River
Saladin Governorate
Articles containing video clips
River islands of Asia